Good Doctor is a 2013 South Korean medical drama television series starring Joo Won, Moon Chae-won, Joo Sang-wook, Kim Min-seo, Chun Ho-jin, Kwak Do-won, and Ko Chang-seok. It aired on KBS2 from August 5 to October 8, 2013, on Mondays and Tuesdays at 21:55 for 20 episodes. The early working title was Green Scalpel (lit. "Green Mes").

Synopsis
Park Si-on (Joo Won) is a savant on the autism spectrum who was sent to a specialized care center as a child, where he was discovered to have a genius-level memory and keen spatial skills. He eventually enters the field of pediatric surgery as a resident, where he is given six months to prove himself capable. However, due to his atypical mental and emotional condition, Si-on faces conflict from his peers and patients, who view him as childlike and unreliable. Most critical is the hotheaded surgeon Kim Do-han (Joo Sang-wook). Do-han was requested by the young surgeon's mentor, Choi Woo-seok (Chun Ho-jin), who is also a director of the hospital, to guide him but is unwilling to do so, as he labels him a soulless robot of a doctor who can only rely heavily on his photographic memory instead of feeling what the patient needs. Despite help from understanding and fair colleagues like Cha Yoon-seo (Moon Chae-won) and Han Jin-wook (Kim Young-kwang), the hospital is a fierce and competitive world, and the challenges Si-on faces become only greater when he falls in love with Yoon-seo, a fellow doctor at the hospital.

Cast

Main
Joo Won as Park Si-on
Choi Ro-woon as young Si-on
Moon Chae-won as Cha Yoon-seo
Joo Sang-wook as Kim Do-han
Kim Min-seo as Yoo Chae-kyung

Supporting

Sungwon University Hospital officials
Chun Ho-jin as Choi Woo-seok, director
Kwak Do-won as Kang Hyun-tae, deputy director
Na Young-hee as Lee Yeo-won
Jo Hee-bong as Go Choong-man, head of the Pediatric Surgery department
Lee Ki-yeol as Lee Hyuk-pil, managing director of the foundation
Jung Man-sik as Kim Jae-joon, head of the Hepatobiliary-Pancreatic Surgery department

Department of Pediatric Surgery
Kim Young-kwang as Han Jin-wook 
A warm and friendly fourth-year resident, who first approaches Park Shi-on when he is shunned by the others.
Yoon Park as Woo Il-kyu, second-year resident
Yoon Bong-gil as Hong Gil-nam, second-year resident
Wang Ji-won as Kim Sun-joo, intern

Nursing division
Ko Chang-seok as Jo Jung-mi, senior nurse
Jin Kyung as Nam Joo-yeon, head nurse
Lee Ah-rin as Ga-kyung
Ha Kyu-won as Hye-jin

Children's ward
Kim Hyun-soo as Na In-hae
Uhm Hyun-kyung as Na In-young
Ahn Sung-hoon as Lee Woo-ram
Yoo Je-gun as Park Ho-suk
Lee Jang-kyung as Kim Ye-eun
Oh Eun-chan as Cha Dong-jin
Yoo Hae-jung as Eun-ok 
Jung Yoon-seok as Kyu-hyun

Others
Yoon Yoo-sun as Oh Kyung-joo, Shi-on's mother
Jung Ho-keun as Park Choon-sung, Shi-on's father
Seo Hyun-chul as Byung-soo
Jeon Jun-hyeok as Park Si-deok, Shi-on's older brother 
Ryu Deok-hwan as adult Si-deok (cameo, ep 10)
Ban Min-jung as Kyu-hyun's mother
Kim Chang-wan as Chairman Jung

Special appearances
Kwak Ji-min as Lee Soo-jin (guest appearance, ep 10-12)
Moon Hee-kyung as Mrs. Jang, Soo-jin's mother-in-law
Kim Sun-hwa as Eun-ok's aunt
Seo Kang-joon as one of the punks who want to beat up Shi-on (ep 12)
In Gyo-jin as Soo-jin's husband (cameo, ep 12)
Yoo Jae-myung as the killer (ep 15)
Kim Young-hee as staff of the family restaurant (ep 17)
Gong Jung-hwan as Professor of Neurosurgery Department (ep 17)
Park Ki-woong as Woong-ki (cameo, ep 20)

Ratings
Good Doctor made a strong debut on the TV ratings chart. It maintained the number one spot in its timeslot for most of its run, with an average viewership rating of 18.0% (AGB Nielsen) and 17.4% (TNmS).

Awards and nominations

In November 2013, the Korea Association of the Welfare Institutes for the Disabled gave the series a plaque of recognition for creating awareness about autism and how socially challenged individuals can contribute to society. In December 2013, Good Doctor also received an award from the Disability Awareness Campaign Headquarters and was designated as a "Good Program" by the Korea Communications Standards Commission.

International adaptations

American

An American remake of the same name, produced by Daniel Dae Kim, debuted in late September 2017 on ABC. The story of a surgeon with autism is set in San Jose, California, airing during fall of 2017.

Japanese
A Japanese remake of the same name starred Kento Yamazaki, Juri Ueno, and Naohito Fujiki aired from July 12 to September 13, 2018 on Fuji TV.

Turkish
A Turkish remake called Mucize Doktor produced by Asena Bülbüloğlu, debuted on September 12, 2019 on Fox Turkey.

Hong Kong
Dr. Koo Hei-sun is the character inspire from Park Si-on in drama called Life After Death produced by Kwan Shu-ming and Kwan Man-sum, debuted on June 8, 2020 on TVB.

References

External links
  
 
 
 

2013 South Korean television series debuts
2013 South Korean television series endings
Korean Broadcasting System television dramas
Korean-language television shows
South Korean medical television series
South Korean television series remade in other languages
Television series by Logos Film
Autism in television